Annan Hospital is a health facility in Stapleton Road, Annan, Dumfries and Galloway, Scotland. It is managed by NHS Dumfries and Galloway.

History 
The facility is a small community hospital which opened in 1987. In the early 21st century it began to specialise in palliative care and rehabilitation. It was forced to close for three days during a gastroenteritis outbreak in 2016.

References 

Hospitals in Dumfries and Galloway
NHS Scotland hospitals
1987 establishments in Scotland
Hospitals established in 1987
Hospital buildings completed in 1987